Expedition Robinson 2002, was the sixth edition of the Swedish version of Expedition Robinson. As a special twist for the sixth season, the players were divided into tribes by gender with the exception of Camilla and Charles, who were deemed "leaders" of their respective tribes. Along with the title of leader came immunity. In episode four a tribal swap took place and there were no longer leaders and the immunity given to the original leaders was usurped. Another major twist this season was that of Utopia, a separate island. On Utopia, two competitors who had already been eliminated would compete for a chance to return to the game. Mariana eventually won the final island duel and was allowed back into the game. Antoni Matacz ultimately won the season with a jury vote of 5–4 over Mariana Dehlin.

Finishing order

Voting history

References
Footnotes

Sources

External links
https://web.archive.org/web/20110613021358/http://svt.se/2.3044/1.63604/program_1
https://web.archive.org/web/20090514235603/http://svt.se/2.2985/1.63363/antoni_matacz?lid=puff_62845&lpos=lasMer
Expedition: Robinson i SVT 1997-2003

 2002
2002 Swedish television seasons